The Lobethal Bierhaus opened for business on 26 May 2007. The operation includes a small all-grain brewery (12 hecto-litre brew length) with accompanying cellar door tasting facilities, off-license bottle sales and a restaurant with matching beer themed foods built around local produce.

See also

Australian pub
Beer in Australia
List of breweries in Australia
South Australian food and drink

References

External links 
 

Australian beer brands
Australian companies established in 2007
Beer brewing companies based in South Australia
Food and drink companies established in 2007